Liophloeus is a genus of weevils in the subfamily Entiminae.

Subgenera and species

 Liophloeodes  Weise, 1894
 Liophloeus chrysopterus  Boheman, 1842 
 Liophloeus gibbus  Boheman, 1842 
 Liophloeus herbstii  Gyllenhal, 1834 
 Liophloeus kiesenwetteri  Tournier, 1889 
 Liophloeus laevifron s Petri, 1912 
 Liophloeus lentus  Germar, 1824 
 Liophloeus liptoviensis  Weise, 1894 
 Liophloeus pupillatus  Apfelbeck, 1928
 Liophloeus  Germar, 1824
 Liophloeus ophthalmicus   Stierlin, 1889 
 Liophloeus paulinoi   Desbrochers, 1875 
 Liophloeus tessulatus   (O.F. Müller, 1776)

References 

Entiminae